Roger Clyne and The Peacemakers is an American rock band from Tempe, Arizona.

History
Roger Clyne and The Peacemakers formed after a lineup shift of The Refreshments, a rock band active in the 1990s known for their top radio hit, "Banditos," as well as the theme song for the hit cartoon show, "King of the Hill"  After two of The Refreshments members left, members Roger Clyne and drummer Paul "P.H." Naffah continued to produce music and changed the moniker to Roger Clyne and The Peacemakers.

Clyne and Naffah were originally joined by former Gin Blossoms member Scott Johnson, who left to rejoin his former band in 2002. James Swafford and Daryl Icard also appeared in the new lineup, but were unable to stay. Steve Larson, former guitarist for Dead Hot Workshop, also joined the band. In January 2009, it was announced that Larson would be departing and would be replaced by Railbenders frontman Jim Dalton on lead guitar.

In early 2004, shortly after the release of ¡Americano!, bassist Danny White left the band to start his own recording studio in Nashville, Tennessee. He was replaced by Nick Scropos, who had been the bassist for another Tempe band, Gloritone. Scropos recorded the bass track "Green and Dumb", on the band's debut CD, Honky Tonk Union.

Mid year in 2007, hometown MLB team, The Arizona Diamondbacks reached out to Roger Clyne and The Peacemakers to write a song for the team and they delivered with the now infamous, "D-Backs Swing."  Played after every home game win, the lyrics can be seen all over the Phoenix metropolitan area by businesses and citizens alike touting, "I back, you back, we back the D-Backs!" 

In true entrepreneurship form, this indie outfit debuted their own brand of ultra-premium tequila in 2011.  Now known as Canción Tequila, which means Song in Spanish, it was formerly named after one of their songs about sipping tequila in the moonlight of Mexico, "Mexican Moonshine."

Roger Clyne and The Peacemakers frequently tour the United States and host their own seaside music festival in Puerto Peñasco. In June 2019, they celebrated the 20th year of their official Circus Mexicus festival.

On  July 2, 2019 Roger Clyne and The Peacemakers was inducted into the Arizona Music and Entertainment Hall of Fame. The event was held at the Tempe Center for the Arts.

Band members

Current members
 Roger Clyne – lead vocals, rhythm guitar, harmonica, kazoo (1998–present)
 Paul "P.H." Naffah – drums, percussion, backing vocals (1998–present)
 Nick Scropos – bass guitar, backing vocals (1998, 2004–present)
 Jim Dalton – lead guitar, backing vocals (2009–present)

Former members
 Scott "Scotty" Johnson – lead guitar, backing vocals (1998–2002)
 Danny White – bass guitar, backing vocals (1998–2004)
 Steve Larson – lead guitar, backing vocals (1998–2009)

Touring guests

 James Anthony Peters – percussion (2007–present)
 Javier "Escubi" Gamez – trumpet (2007–present)
 Jon Villa – trumpet (2007–present)

Discography
Honky Tonk Union (1999)
Real to Reel (2000)
Sonoran Hope and Madness (2002)
¡Americano! (2004)
Live at Billy Bob's Texas (2005)
Four Unlike Before (2006)
No More Beautiful World (2007)
Turbo Ocho (2008)
Glow in the Dark (2009)
Unida Cantina (2011)
The Independent (2014)
Native Heart (2017)
Live at the Belly Up (2017)

References

External links
 Official website
 Roger Clyne's Official Tequila
 Roger Clyne and The Peacemakers on the Live Music Archive
 High Country News Article, December 25, 2006
 I AM FUEL, YOU ARE FRIENDS Interview, 2006
 KTBG interview
 Phoenix New Times Interview, 1999
 WASTIN' AWAY ON THE NORTH COAST Interview, 2007
 INTERVIEW WITH A LIFEONAIRE, ROGER CLYNE, 2009
 Clyne & The Peacemaker’s new Album is Refreshing [MUSIC REVIEW] 1 Posted April 29, 2014 by Stanton Brasher in Rock
 https://kjzz.org/content/1038776/arizona-music-hall-fame-spotlights-tempe-sound-roger-clyne-pistoleros

Rock music groups from Arizona
American alternative country groups
Musical groups from Tempe, Arizona
Musical groups established in 1998